Courtney A. Miller is an American neuroscientist and Professor of the Department of Molecular Medicine at the Scripps Research Institute in Jupiter, Florida. Miller investigates the biological basis of neurological and neuropsychiatric diseases and develops novel therapeutics based on her mechanistic discoveries.

Early life and education 
Miller completed her undergraduate degree at the University of California, Santa Barbara majoring in Biopsychology. After graduating in 1999, Miller started her PhD in Neurobiology and Behavior at the University of California, Irvine. Under the mentorship of Dr. John F. Marshall, Miller studied the biological basis of drug addiction in rodent models. Since relapse is common in drug abusers, Miller sought to understand the biological basis of this phenomenon. Miller first dissected the neural circuits that are activated during re-exposure to an environment previously associated with cocaine. Miller found that, during expression of drug induced place preference, the Basolateral Amygdala complex provides more excitatory drive to the Nucleus Accumbens Core than the Prelimbic cortex. In a first author paper in Neuron, Miller reported that inhibiting ERK kinase MEK prevents the activation of ERK in the Nucleus Accumbens Core and inhibits conditioned place preference. Her findings suggested that memories of drug-cue pairings can be pharmacologically or therapeutically ameliorated to potentially reduce relapse in drug abusers.

Miller completed her PhD in 2005 and then worked as a Research Scientist at Cenomed Pharmaceuticals. In 2006, Miller began a postdoctoral fellowship at the University of Alabama Birmingham and held the title of scientific director of the Behavior Core at the University of Alabama Birmingham from 2006 to 2009. At UAB, Miller studied neuroepigenetics and found that DNA methylation along with the process of histone acetylation regulates memory formation and synaptic plasticity. Also while at UAB, Miller completed a degree in Technology Ventures at the UAB School of Business from 2007 to 2008.

Career and research 
In 2009, Miller was appointed an assistant professorship at The Scripps Research Institute in Jupiter, Florida. In 2013, Miller was granted tenure and now remains at Scripps conducting research on neurological diseases with a specific focus on drug addiction and post-traumatic stress disorder. With her background in industry and business, Miller has a strong focus on making sure her research is translational and will progress towards the drug discovery pipeline.

Miller and her lab made a significant discovery in 2015 regarding the potential to target the actin cytoskeleton as a means to treat relapsing methamphetamine addiction. Miller found that inhibiting actin polymerization in the amygdala, with a non-muscle myosin II inhibitor, disrupted drug-seeking behavior. In 2017, Miller and her group furthered these findings by exploring the effects of Blebbistatin, a small molecular non-muscle myosin II inhibitor, on methamphetamine-related memories compared to cocaine and morphine-related memories. They found that the effects of Blebbistatin on memory disruption are specific to methamphetamine-related memories and they are amygdala dependent. This finding will pave the way for specific therapeutic interventions for addiction that treatments that do not require re-exposure to the drug cues. For this discovery, Miller was honored with the Presidential Early Career Award and received a five-year research grant to support furthering her findings towards clinical trials.

In 2019, Miller and her group found a microRNA in the amygdala that is specifically elevated after trauma. They discovered this microRNA by sequencing RNA from the Basolateral Amygdala, a brain region known to be implicated in fear conditioning, to observe differences in microRNAs levels after fear conditioning. Fear conditioning is done in this experiment to model the biological processes that might occur after traumas that precede the development of post-traumatic stress disorder. Miller's results shows that the most robustly down-regulated microRNA after fear conditioning was mir-589-3p. Miller and her group further found that inhibiting this microRNA interfered with expression and extinction of fear memories. Interestingly, the difference in microRNA mir-598-3p level and the effect of its inhibition was only observed in male but not female mice.

In addition to her translational research, Miller is a strong advocate for women in science and is the cofounder of the Professional Women's Nexus, an organization that provides a network for female professionals to connect and support each other in their career. Miller has given many talks on how to foster early career success for women and in 2019 she organized the SFN Professional Development workshop “Addressing issues facing women in the early stages of their scientific career”.

Awards and achievements

 Host, SFN Women in Neuroscience Luncheon, "Effective self-promotion" (2018)
 Contributor, NIH Opioid Meeting Series, "Understanding the neurobiological mechanisms of pain" (2017)
 Organizer, SFN Professional Development Workshop, "Addressing issues facing women in the early stages of their scientific career"
 PECASE (Presidential Early Career Award for Scientists and Engineers), awarded by President Obama (2016)
 Distinguished Speaker Award, UNC Department of Psychology and Neuroscience (2016)
 TSRI Outstanding Mentor Award (2015)
 Most influential paper published by Neuron in 2007 (2014)
 Associate Member, American College of Neuropharmacology (ACNP; 2014)
 Faculty of 1000 Selections (2013, 2010, 2007)
 Kauffman Fellow, Venture Capital Program (2008)
 Co-Organizer, SFN Social, Professional Women's Nexus (PWN), "Breaking barriers for young women in science" (2008–present)
 Co-founder, Professional Women's Nexus (PWN) (2007)
 NIDA Young Investigator Award (2005)

Select publications 

 Miller CA and Marshall JF (2004). Altered prelimbic cortex output during cue-elicited drug seeking. Journal of Neuroscience 24, 6889–97.
 Miller CA and Marshall JF (2005). Altered Fos expression in neural pathways involved in cue-elicited drug seeking. European Journal of Neuroscience 21, 1385–93.
 Miller CA and Marshall JF (2005). Molecular substrates for retrieval and reconsolidation of cocaine-associated contextual memory. Neuron 47, 873–84.
 Levenson MJ, Roth TL, Lubin FD, Miller CA, Huang IC, Desai P, Malone L, Sweatt JD (2006). Evidence that DNA (Cytosine-5) methyltransferases regulate synaptic plasticity in the hippocampus. Journal of Biological Chemistry 281, 15763–73.
 Miller CA and Sweatt JD (2007). Covalent modification of DNA regulates memory formation. Neuron 53, 857–69.
 Miller CA, Susan Campbell and Sweatt JD (2008). DNA methylation and histone acetylation work in concert to regulate memory formation and synaptic plasticity. Neurobiology Learning and Memory 89, 599–603.
 Guo X, Hamilton PJ, Reish N, Sweatt JD, Miller CA, and Rumbaugh G (2008). Reduced expression of the NMDA receptor-interacting protein SynGAP causes behavioral abnormalities that model symptoms of schizophrenia. Neuropsychopharmacology 34, 1659–72.
 Cahill ME, Xie Z, Day M, Barbolina MV, Miller CA, Weiss C, Radulovic J, Sweatt JD, Disterhoft JF, Surmeier DJ and Penzes P (2009). Kalarin regulates cortical spine morphogenesis and disease-related behavioral phenotypes. Proceedings of the National Academy of Sciences 106, 13058–63.
 Kilgore M*, Miller CA*, Fass DM, Hennig KM, Haggerty S, Sweatt JD and Rumbaugh G (2010). Inhibitors of Class I histone deacetylases reverse contextual memory deficits in a mouse model of Alzheimer's Disease. Neuropsychopharmacology 35, 870–80.
 Miller CA, Gavin CF, White JA, Parrish RR, Honasoge A, Yancey CR, Rivera IM, Rubio MD, Rumbaugh G and Sweatt JD (2010) Cortical DNA methylation maintains remote memory. Nature Neuroscience 13: 664–6.
 Rex C, Gavin CF, Rubio MD, Kramar EA, Jia Y, Huganir RL, Muzyczka N, Gall CM, Miller CA, Lynch G and Rumbaugh G (2010) Myosin IIB regulates actin dynamics during synaptic plasticity and memory formation. Neuron 67:603-17.
 Clement JP, Ozkan ED, Aceti M, Miller CA and Rumbaugh G (2013) SYNGAP1 links the maturation rate of excitatory synapses to the duration of critical-period synaptic plasticity. Journal of Neuroscience 33:10447-52. 
 Young EJ, Griggs EM, Aceti M, Fuchs RA, Zigmond Z, Rumbaugh G and Miller CA (2014) Selective, retrieval-independent disruption of methamphetamine-associated memory by actin depolymerization. Biological Psychiatry 75:96-104. (Priority Communication)        
 Ozkan E, Creson TC, Kramar EA, Rojas C, Seese RR, Babyan AH, Shi Y, Lucero R, Xu X, Noebels JL, Miller CA, Lynch G and Rumbaugh G (2014) Reduced cognition in Syngap1 mutants is caused by isolated damage within developing forebrain excitatory neurons. Neuron 82:1317-33. 
 Aguilar-Valles A, Vaissiere T, Griggs EM, Mikaelsson M, Takacs I, Young EJ, Rumbaugh G and Miller CA (2014) Methamphetamine-associated memory is regulated by a writer and an eraser of permissive histone methylation. Biological Psychiatry 76:57-65. 
 Aceti M, Creson TK, Vaissiere T, Rojas C, Huang W, Wang Y, Petralia RS, Page DT, Miller CA and Rumbaugh G (2015) Syngap1 haploinsufficiency damages a postnatal critical period of pyramidal cell structural maturation linked to cortical circuit assembly. Biological Psychiatry 77:805-15. 
 Rumbaugh G*, Sillivan SE*, Ozkan ED, Rojas CS, Hubbs CR, Aceti M, Kilgore M, Kudugunti S, Puthanveettil SV, Sweatt JD, Rusche J and Miller CA (2015) Pharmacological selectivity within class I histone deacetylases predicts effects on synaptic function and memory rescue. Neuropsychopharmacology 40:2307-16.
 Sillivan SE, Vaissiere T and Miller CA (2015) Neuroepigenetic regulation of pathogenic memories. Neuroepigenetics, 1:28-33.
 Ozkan ED, Aceti M, Creson TK, Rojas CS, Hubbs CR, McGuire MN, Kakad PP, Miller CA and Rumbaugh G (2015) Input-specific regulation of hippocampal circuit maturation by non-muscle myosin IIB. Journal of Neurochemistry 134:429-44. 
 Mediouni S,  Miller C, Marcondes MCG, McLaughlin J, Valente ST (2015) The cross-talk of HIV-1 Tat and methamphetamine in HIV-associated neurocognitive disorders. Frontiers in Microbiology, 6:1164. 
 Young EJ, Briggs SB and Miller CA (2015) The actin cytoskeleton as a therapeutic target for the prevention of relapse to methamphetamine use. CNS & Neurological Disorders - Drug Targets 14:731-7. 
 Young EJ*, Blouin AM*, Briggs SB*, Sillivan SE, Lin L, Cameron MD, Rumbaugh G and Miller CA (2016) Nonmuscle myosin IIB as a therapeutic target for the prevention of relapse to methamphetamine use. Molecular Psychiatry, 21:615-23. 
 Mavrikavi M, Girardet C, Kern A, Brantley AF, Miller CA, Macarthu Hr, Marks DL and Butler AA (2016) Melantocortin-3 receptors in the limbic system mediate feeding-related motivational responses during weight loss. Molecular Metabolism, 5:566-79. 
 Blouin AM*, Sillivan SE*, Joseph NF and Miller CA (2016) The potential of epigenetics in stress-enhanced fear learning models of PTSD. Learning & Memory, 23:576-86. 
 Girardet C, Mavrikaki MM, Stevens JR, Miller CA, Marks DL and Butler AA (2017) Melanocortin-3 receptors expressed in Nkx2.1(+ve) neurons are sufficient for controlling appetitive responses to hypocaloric conditioning. Scientific Reports, 7:44444. 
 Briggs SB*, Blouin AM*, Young EJ, Rumbaugh G and Miller CA (2017) Memory disrupting effects of nonmuscle myosin II inhibition depend on the class of abused drug and brain region. Learning & Memory, 24:70-75.
 Young EJ, Briggs SB, Rumbaugh G and Miller CA (2017) Nonmuscle myosin II inhibition disrupts methamphetamine-associated memory in females and adolescents. Neurobiology of Learning and Memory, 139: 109–116. 
 Sillivan SE, Joseph NF, Jamieson S, King ML, Chevere-Torres I, Fuentes I, Shumyatsky GP, Brantley AF, Rumbaugh G and Miller CA (2017) Susceptibility and resilience to PTSD-like behaviors in inbred mice. Biological Psychiatry, 82:924-933. 
 Furth D, Vaissiere T, Tzortzi O, Xuan Y, Martin A, Lazaridis I, Spigolon G, Fisone G, Tomer R, Deisseroth K, Carlen M, Miller CA, Rumbaugh G and Meletis K. An interactive framework for whole-brain maps at cellular resolution. Nature Neuroscience, 21:139-149. 
 Spicer TP, Hubbs C, Vaissiere T, Collia D, Rojas C, Kilinc M, Vick K, Madoux F, Baillargeon P, Shumate J, Martemyanov KA, Page DT, Puthanveettil S, Hodder P, Davis R, Miller CA, Scampavia L, Rumbaugh G (2018) Improved scalability of neuron-based phenotypic screening assays for therapeutic discovery in neuropsychiatric disorders. Molecular Neuropsychiatry, 3:141-150.

References

Living people
Year of birth missing (living people)
American neuroscientists
Scripps Research faculty
American women scientists